In Japan, Jurōjin (寿老人) is one of the Seven Gods of Fortune or Shichifukujin, according to Taoist beliefs. He is the god of longevity. Jurōjin originated from the Chinese Taoist god, the Old Man of the South Pole/Star of the Old Man. He is known as the immortal of the Northern Song dynasty (960–1127), and may have been a historical figure of the period. Jurōjin is identified as the personification of the Southern Polar Star. While paintings and statues of Jurōjin are considered auspicious, he never developed a following independent of the other Seven Gods of Fortune.

People believe himself as the God of Wisdom and longevity had been live in the world for 1500 years. People respect to acquire safety and happy living.

Jurōjin is often identified with Fukurokuju, another of the Seven Gods of Fortune. In some accounts, the two are said to inhabit the same body. As such, the two are often confused.

Jurōjin walks with a staff and a fan. He is depicted as an old man of slight stature, and by tradition, less than 3 shaku (approximately ). He is depicted with a long white beard and often a very tall, bald head. He has a scroll tied to his staff, on which is written the lifespan of all living things. The scroll is sometimes identified as a Buddhist sutra. The deer, a symbol of longevity, usually (but not always) accompanies him as a messenger, as do other long-lived animals such as the crane and the tortoise.

Jurōjin is a popular subject of Japanese ink wash paintings. He was introduced into the Japanese art tradition by Zen Buddhist painters, and depictions of Jurōjin span from the Muromachi period (1337–1573) through the Edo period (1603–1868). Artists who depicted Jurōjin as a subject include Sesshū (1420–1506), Sesson Shukei (1504–1589), Kanō Tan'yū (1602–1674), and Maruyama Ōkyo (1733–1795).

See also
Fu, Lu, and Shou
Old Man of the South Pole
Fukurokuju

References

Japanese gods
Longevity myths